This article presents the discography of TKA.

Studio albums

Compilations

Singles

References

Discographies of American artists

Hip hop discographies